Narendra Singh Negi (born 12 August 1949), also referred as 'Garh Ratan' and 'Bob Dylan of the hills' is one of the most prominent folk singers, composer and a poet of the Garhwal and Uttarakhand who prominently sings in Garhwali language. Reportedly, he has sung more than 1000 songs. His unparalleled work in the field of folk music of Uttarakhand is an inspiration for all the upcoming singers of Uttarakhand.

Background
Negi was born in Pauri town in Pauri Garhwal District (Uttarakhand) where he also completed his schooling. His father was a Naib Subedar in the Indian army. For graduation he moved to Rampur with his cousin Ajit Singh Negi who taught him Tabla. From his childhood he was fond of listening to traditional folk singers in various cultural events. He wrote and composed his first song in 1974 after getting inspired by the hard work done by his mother and other women of the town.

Music career
Negi recorded his first self-composed song in 1974. In 1976, Negi released his first music album "Garhwali Geetmala." These Geetmalas were in 10 different parts. As these Garhwali Geetmalas were from different companies he was finding it difficult to manage them. So he finally switched to releasing his cassettes by giving them separate titles. His first album came with the title called "Burans".

Negi is credited for introducing main melodic phrases of 12 beats and an irregular four-beat rhythmic pattern (typical of the Jaunsari region) to contemporary songs. He has written songs on love, sorrow, historic events, social, political and environment issue. He has sung in every genre of singing popular in Uttarakhand like "Jagar", "Mangal", "Basanti", "Khuder", "Chhopati", Chounphula and Jhumeila. He has sung in different local languages like Garhwali, Kumaoni, Jaunsari prevailing in the state.

He has also given his voice in Garhwali movies such as Chakrachal, Gharjawai, and Meri Ganga Holi Ta Maima Aali. Bollywood singers including Udit Narayan, Lata Mangeshkar, Asha Bhonsle, Poornima, Suresh Wadkar, Anuradha Paudwal, Jaspal also sang in Garhwali films under his music direction. He also sang with fellow Garhwali enthusiast Madhuri Barthwal.

Awards

Sangeet Natak Akademi 2022
Narendra Singh Negi has been awarded the Sangeet Natak Akademi Award in Delhi on 9 April 2022. Chief Minister Pushkar Singh Dhami has congratulated the state's folk singer Narendra Singh Negi for being honored with the prestigious Sangeet Natak Akademi Award at the national level. He said that the honor given to Narendra Singh Negi in the field of traditional folk songs is also the honor of the state.

Awaaz Ratna Award
On the occasion of Hindi Diwas (15 September 2021), the folk singer of Uttarakhand, Narendra Singh Negi has been honored with the Awaaz Ratna Award 2021.

List of albums

List of movies

References

External links 
 
 
 

People from Uttarakhand
Living people
People from Pauri
Culture of Uttarakhand
1949 births
Garhwali people
Uttarakhand music
Recipients of the Sangeet Natak Akademi Award